George Dempsey (11 August 1905 – 3 August 1985) was an Australian cyclist. He competed in two events, the men's sprint and the 50 kilometres, at the 1924 Summer Olympics.

References

External links
 

1905 births
1985 deaths
Australian male cyclists
Olympic cyclists of Australia
Cyclists from New South Wales
Cyclists at the 1924 Summer Olympics
People from Cootamundra
20th-century Australian people